The 1966 All-Ireland Minor Football Championship was the 35th staging of the All-Ireland Minor Football Championship, the Gaelic Athletic Association's premier inter-county Gaelic football tournament for boys under the age of 18.

Derry entered the championship as defending champions, however, they were defeated by Down in the Ulster final.

On 25 September 1966, Mayo won the championship following a 1–12 to 1–8 defeat of Down in the All-Ireland final. This was their third All-Ireland title overall and their first title in 13 championship seasons.

Results

Connacht Minor Football Championship

Quarter-Final

Roscommon win over Leitrim.

Semi-Finals

Mayo 4-1- Sligo 0–7.

Roscommon beat Galway.

Final

Mayo 1-9 Roscommon 0-7 Castlebar.

Leinster Minor Football Championship

Ulster Minor Football Championship

Munster Minor Football Championship

All-Ireland Minor Football Championship
Semi-Finals

Final

References

1966
All-Ireland Minor Football Championship